Jeanette MacDonald (1903–1965) and Nelson Eddy (1901–1967) were a popular screen couple in the 1930s and '40s, specializing in musicals. They starred in eight films together, all for Metro-Goldwyn-Mayer. Eddy was an opera singer before he became a film star, while MacDonald turned to opera later in her career. Their best-known onscreen duet is "Indian Love Call", from Rose Marie.

Filmography

References

Notes

Bibliography

MacDonald and Eddy